Apolima is the smallest of the four inhabited islands of Samoa. It lies in the Apolima Strait, between the country's two largest islands: Upolu to the east, and Savai'i to the west.

The island has one village settlement, Apolima Tai, with a population of 75 (2006 Census). The small settlement is situated in the interior's flat plateau, on the northern side.

Apolima is the rim of an extinct volcanic crater with a maximum height of 165 m. Its area is slightly less than one square kilometer. The only access to the island is by boat.

The island's shape is like an upturned bowl surrounded by steep cliffs. There is a broad opening to the sea on the northern side, which is the main entry point. Entry is only by boat. 

There are two neighbouring islands in the strait, Manono Island, which has a small population, and the smaller, uninhabited islet of Nu'ulopa.

Apolima island is part of the political district of Aiga-i-le-Tai.

In August 2022 the Ministry of Natural Resources and Environment began discussions with local residents about eradicating rats from the island to protect the local environment.

Gallery

See also 
 Samoa Islands

References 

Islands of Samoa
Aiga-i-le-Tai